The 1976 United States presidential election in Delaware took place on November 2, 1976, as part of the 1976 United States presidential election. State voters chose three representatives, or electors, to the Electoral College, who voted for president and vice president.

Delaware was won by Jimmy Carter (D–Georgia), with 51.98% of the popular vote. Carter defeated incumbent President Gerald Ford (R–Michigan), who finished with 46.57% of the popular vote. Eugene McCarthy (Independent–Minnesota) finished third in Delaware with 1.03% of the statewide popular vote.

This was the last time that a Marxist political party appeared on the presidential ballot in Delaware until the 2008 election when the Socialist Workers Party appeared on the ballot.

Results

See also
 United States presidential elections in Delaware

References

Delaware
1976
1976 Delaware elections